The Vogue Theater is a historic movie theater in downtown Chula Vista, California. It was designed by the Architect Frank Hope Jr. in 1943, and opened on January 19, 1945. The theater is a poured in place concrete building and seats 825.
Due to its configuration and stage, the theater has been a venue for several Chula Vista and San Diego political debates by the likes of former San Diego City Mayor Roger Hedgecock, and current Chula Vista Mayor Cheryl Cox.

The Vogue Theater operated as a single screen theater for 61 until it closed in 2006.
The Vogue Theater was denominated as historical resource by the City for Chula Vista in 2011. On February 20, 2014, Amorphica Design Research Office received permits by the City of Chula Vista to restore and renovate The Vogue Theater back to its original state with other uses to the building.

References

External links
History of The Vogue Theater in Chula Vista Retrieved November 25, 2011
World Cinema History Retrieved March 8, 2011
Early San Diego theaters, Theatre History in the Nineteenth Century Retrieved November 25, 2011

Theatres in California
Theatres completed in 1945
Buildings and structures in Chula Vista, California
Culture of Chula Vista, California